SUMO-conjugating enzyme UBC9 is an enzyme that in humans is encoded by the UBE2I gene. It is also sometimes referred to as "ubiquitin conjugating enzyme E2I" or "ubiquitin carrier protein 9", even though these names do not accurately describe its function.

Expression 

Four alternatively spliced transcript variants encoding the same protein have been found for this gene.

Function 

The UBC9 protein encoded by the UBE2I gene constitutes a core machinery in the cell's sumoylation pathway. Sumoylation is a process in which a Small Ubiquitin-like MOdifier (SUMO) is covalently attached to other proteins in order to modify their behaviour. For example, sumoylation may affect a protein's localization in the cell, its ability to interact with other proteins or DNA.

UBC9 performs the third step in the sumoylation life cycle: the conjugation step. When SUMO protein precursors are first expressed, they first undergo a maturation step in which the four C-terminal amino acids are removed, revealing a di-glycine motif. In a second step, an E1 activating complex binds to SUMO at its di-glycine and passes it on to the E2 protein Ubc9, where it forms a thioester bond with a cysteine residue within Ubc9's catalytic pocket. The loaded Ubc9 is now ready to perform the sumoylation of its various target proteins (also called substrates). It recognizes a particular motif of amino acid residues in these substrates: A large hydrophobic residue, followed by a lysine, followed by a spacer, followed by an acidic residue. This motif is usually described in shorthand as ΨKxD/E. The central lysine within the substrate's recognition motif is inserted into the catalytic pocket. There the carboxyl terminus of SUMO's di-glycine forms a peptide bond with the ε-amino group of the lysine. This process can be assisted by an E3 ligase protein.

The sumoylation process is reversible. SENP proteases can remove SUMO from sumoylated proteins, freeing it to be used in further sumoylation reactions.

Clinical significance relevance 

The protein UBC9 encoded by the UBE2I gene has been shown to be targeted by multiple viruses, including HIV and HPV. It has been hypothesized that these viruses hijack UBC9 to serve their own purposes.

Interactions 

UBE2I has been shown to interact with:

 ATF2, 
 Androgen receptor, 
 BLMH, 
 DACH1, 
 DNMT3A, 
 DNMT3B, 
 DAXX, 
 ETS1, 
 FHIT, 
 IPO13, 
 MAP3K1 and 
 MITF,
 P53, 
 PIAS1, 
 PIAS2, 
 RAD51, 
 RANBP2, 
 RANGAP1, 
 SAE2, 
 SALL1, 
 SUMO1, 
 TCF3, 
 TNFRSF1A, 
 TOP1,  and
 WT1.

Notes

References